The 1995 Horsham District Council election took place on 4 May 1995 to elect members of Horsham District Council in England. It was held on the same day as other local elections. The Liberal Democrats gained control of the council from the Conservatives with a 3 seat majority. This was the first time ever the Conservative Party lost control of Horsham District Council since they first won overall control in 1976.

Council composition 

Prior to the election, the composition of the council was:

After the election, the composition of the council was:

Results summary

Ward results

Billingshurst

Bramber & Upper Beeding

Broadbridge Heath

Chanctonbury

Cowfold

Denne

Forest

Henfield

Holbrook

Itchingfield & Shipley

Nuthurst

Pulborough & Coldwatham

Riverside

Roffey North

Rudgwick

Rusper

Slinfold

Southwater

Steyning

Storrington

Sullington

Trafalgar

Warnham

West Chiltington

West Grinstead

References

1995 English local elections
May 1995 events in the United Kingdom
1995
1990s in West Sussex